This is a list of navigable canals that are at least partially located in Switzerland.  The canals are listed here in alphabetic order of the name (without generic).

Currently navigable canals

Formerly navigable canals

Incomplete navigable canal projects

See also
Transport in Switzerland
List of rivers of Switzerland

 
Canals
Canals
Switzerland
Canals